Ghera, also known as Bara, is an Indo-Aryan language of Pakistan. It is spoken by around 10,000 people in a single area within the city of Hyderabad. It belongs to the Western Hindi language group. It shares 87% of its basic vocabulary with the Gurgula language, but in its grammar it is substantially different.

References

 
Languages of Sindh